Liancalus virens is a species of fly in the family Dolichopodidae.

References

Hydrophorinae
Insects described in 1763
Taxa named by Giovanni Antonio Scopoli